Kirkcaldy Rugby Football Club is a rugby union club from Kirkcaldy, Fife, Scotland.

History

The team was established in 1873  Home games are played at Beveridge Park.

The club hold a community sevens tournament annually, with 22 teams taking part in 2014.

Their Samoan head coach, Quintan Sanft, has been with the club since 2005.

Kirkcaldy Sevens

The club host the Kirkcaldy Sevens tournament. Entrants play for the Heggie Cup.

Honours

Men

 Scottish National League Division One
 Runners-Up: 1999-00
 Scottish National League Division Two
 Champions (4): 1988–89, 1996–97, 2008–09, 2017-18
 Scottish Rugby Shield
 Winners: 2001-02
 Runners-Up: 2007-08
 Kirkcaldy Sevens
 Champions: 1989, 1990
 Dundee HSFP Sevens
 Champions: 1924
 Crieff Sevens
 Champions: 2012, 2017
 Waid Academy F.P. Sevens
 Champions: 1954, 1955, 1956, 1959, 1967, 1998
 Glenrothes Sevens
 Champions: 1989, 1990, 1994
 Midlands District Sevens
 Champions: 1927, 1956, 1970, 1993, 1995, 1996
 Howe of Fife Sevens
 Champions: 1966
 Stirling Sevens
 Champions: 1966

Women

 Mull Sevens
 Champions: 2003, 2007

Notable players
 Bob Howie, Scotland internationalist
 Dave Howie, Scotland internationalist

See also
 Dunfermline RFC
 Glenrothes RFC
 Howe of Fife RFC

References

External links
 Club website
 
 

Rugby clubs established in 1873
Scottish rugby union teams
Kirkcaldy
1873 establishments in Scotland
Rugby union in Fife